Peter Chríbik (born 2 February 1999) is a Slovak defensive footballer.

Club career

MŠK Žilina reserves
Chríbik made his debut in DOXXXbet liga on 9 March 2016. He came on as a replacement for Rastislav Václavik, who suffered an injury, in a fixture against Senec, during the first half. Žilina B went on to win 1:3.

FK Pohronie
On 8 February 2020, Žilina had announced that Chríbik and forward Roland Gerebenits, will join Pohronie on half-season loan. In Chríbik's case, it was noted as a first experience with senior football, as in Žilina he failed to make it to the senior squad, playing for the reservers only. Chríbik's contract therefore included an option to buy. Gerebenits, however, was expected to return to Žilina, with Pohronie providing him with senior football play-time to definitively penetrate Žilina's first squad. During the autumn half of the season, Pohronie already hosted former Žilina player Michal Klec.

Chríbik made his Fortuna Liga debut on 15 February 2020, at pod Zoborom, in a goal-less tie against the home side, Nitra. Chríbik entered the pitch in the 76th minute as a tactical replacement for Peter Mazan, with the primary aim of maintaining Tomáš Jenčo's clean sheet. Gerebenits also made an appearance in this match, in the starting line-up. He was replaced some ten minutes before Chríbik's fielding.

Chribík then made his starting-XI debut in the following round against his mother club of MŠK Žilina, on 22 February 2020. He played as a defensive midfielder along with Michal Obročník. Despite a solid and a long-resisting performance, Pohronie went on to lose, at home, 0:1, with the match's sole goal scored by Polish youth international Dawid Kurminowski in the second half, after he had replaced Lukáš Jánošík.

He departed from the club in January 2021, after he was no longer a part of the plans of Jan Kameník.

FC Nitra
In February 2021, Chríbik signed with Nitra.

References

External links
  
 MŠK Žilina profile 
 Futbalnet profile 

1999 births
Living people
Sportspeople from Žilina
Slovak footballers
Slovak expatriate footballers
Association football defenders
MŠK Žilina players
FK Pohronie players
FC Nitra players
MŠK Púchov players
2. Liga (Slovakia) players
Slovak Super Liga players
Austrian Regionalliga players
Expatriate footballers in Austria
Slovak expatriate sportspeople in Austria